Manjiri Prabhu (born 30 September 1964) is an Indian author, TV producer and filmmaker. She has been hailed as the 'Desi Agatha Christie' (Indian Agatha Christie) by the media and is acknowledged as being the first woman writer of mystery fiction in India.

Early life 
Manjiri Atmaram Prabhu was born in Pune to Atmaram Prabhu, a businessman and Shobha Prabhu, a prominent astrologer in a family of five siblings. Manjiri started experimenting with novels at a young age and acknowledges Enid Blyton and Agatha Christie as her early inspiration. She attended St. Joseph's High School and did her graduation and Masters in French from Ferguson College and Pune University. Manjiri then completed her post graduate diploma in Social Communication Media from Sophia College, Mumbai. and PhD in Communication Science from Pune University.

Career 
Manjiri joined the State Institute of Educational Technology (Balchitravani) as a TV producer where she directed more than 200 infotainment programs aimed at children and young adults. During this time, her unpublished novel was adapted into a Hindi feature film titled Kuchh Dil Ne Kaha for the National Film Development Corporation of India and she wrote the script and dialogues for the same. She also produced short drama films for Filmaka and directed travelogues. Manjiri is also the founder-director of the Pune International Literary Festival and International Festival of Spiritual India.

Bibliography 
Symphony of Hearts (Romantic Suspense), Rupa (1994)
Silver in the Mist (Romantic Mystery), Rupa, (1995)
Roles: Reel and Real (Non-fiction on Hindi films), (2001)
The Cosmic Clues (Mystery Detective fiction), Bantam Books, (2004) 
The Astral Alibi (Mystery Detective fiction), Bantam Dell, USA, (2006), republished as Stellar Signs, Jaico, (2014)
The Cavansite Conspiracy (Romantic Suspense Thriller), Rupa, (2011)
The Gypsies at Noelle's Retreat - Riva Parkar Mystery series, Times Group Books, (2013)
In the Shadow of Inheritance (Romantic Mystery Suspense), Penguin India, (2014)
The Trail of Four (Destination Mystery Thriller), Bloomsbury India (2017)
Revolt Of The Lamebren (Dystopian Science Fantasy), Readomania (2018)
Voice Of The Runes (Destination Mystery Thriller), Bloomsbury India (2018)
Mystery At Malabar Cottage (Children's Mystery), Readomania  (2019)
 Flipped- Adventure Stories Children's Anthology), Story - The Treasure on Cocofarm, HarperCollins India (2019)
 The Final Act of Love (Romantic Mystery Suspense), Amazon Kindle (2020)
 The Adventures of Mithoo (Children's Fantasy), Readomania (2021)
 The DOGtrine of Peace (Non-fiction Spiritual), Readomania (2021)

Awards and recognition 

The Astral Alibi honored as 'Notable Fiction' in Kiriyama Prize (2007)
The Cavansite Conspiracy awarded 'Best Mystery' by BTB Awards (2012)

References 

1964 births
Indian women television producers
Indian television producers
Indian women novelists
Indian women filmmakers
Living people
Writers from Pune
20th-century Indian novelists
21st-century Indian novelists
20th-century Indian women writers
21st-century Indian women writers
Women writers from Maharashtra
Novelists from Maharashtra
Film producers from Maharashtra
Women television producers